Byron Newton Rimm II (born January 30, 1974) is an American college basketball coach, more recently the interim head men's basketball coach at IUPUI.

Coaching career
Rimm is a 1999 graduate of Cal State Los Angeles and lettered in basketball as a junior in the 1996–97 season after transferring from Ventura College. In his one season at Cal State Los Angeles, Rimm averaged 4.7 points per game in 19 games.

While completing his studies at Cal State Los Angeles, Rimm served as a junior college basketball assistant coach, first at Pasadena City College in 1997 then at Chaffey College.

Rimm was head men's basketball coach at Prairie View A&M from the 2006–07 season until resigning on January 27, 2016.

On October 12, 2016, Texas A&M–Corpus Christi men's basketball head coach Willis Wilson hired Rimm as director of basketball operations.

On July 31, 2017, Rimm was hired as assistant coach at UC Riverside.

On November 14, 2018, Rimm was hired by IUPUI as associate head coach under Jason Gardner. On August 28, 2019, he was named interim head coach of IUPUI for the 2019-20 season after Gardner's resignation stemming from an OWI arrest. On June 11, 2020, due to the ongoing COVID-19 pandemic, which forced the school to shut down their coaching search, IUPUI announced that Rimm would be retained for at least the 2020-21 season.

Head coaching record

References

1974 births
Living people
American men's basketball coaches
American men's basketball players
Basketball coaches from California
Basketball players from California
Cal State Los Angeles Golden Eagles men's basketball players
Cal State San Bernardino Coyotes men's basketball coaches
Chaffey Panthers men's basketball coaches
College men's basketball head coaches in the United States
Guards (basketball)
Pasadena City Lancers men's basketball coaches
Prairie View A&M Panthers basketball coaches
Ventura Pirates men's basketball players